Vijender Gupta (born 14 August 1963) is an Indian politician of BJP party from Delhi. He is presently a Member of Legislative Assembly from Rohini constituency and also a member of BJP's National Executive. In Delhi state elections 2015, he was one of the three BJP candidates to win and was also the president of Delhi state unit of BJP.

Personal life
Gupta married Shobha Gautam turned Dr. Shobha Vijender, pioneering NGO named "SAMPURNA" on 1 November 1987. They have a daughter named Aaina married to Varun Nair and a son named Aadhar married to Garima Jain.

Political career
An alumnus of Shri Ram College of Commerce and a three time councillor from Rohini, Gupta is a former vice president of Delhi University Students Union.

He started his political career as secretary of Janta Vidyarthi Morcha in 1980. He was quickly elevated to Joint Convener of Janta Vidyarthi Morcha in 1983. In 1995 he was appointed President of Bhartiya Janta Yuva Morcha in Keshav Puram District.

His electoral journey started in 1997 when he was elected as Councilor of Municipal Corporation of Delhi. He served as Chairman of Law & General Purpose Committee, Municipal Corporation of Delhi from 1997 to 1998 and Deputy Chairman of High Powered House Tax Committee from 2001 to 2002. He has been elected three times in the Municipal elections from Rohini that too with the highest margin in Delhi. To his credit, Gupta developed Rohini as a model municipal unit.

He was elevated to Secretary of BJP Delhi in 2002. Gupta had also contested the 2009 Lok Sabha election from the Chandni Chowk constituency against Kapil Sibal of the Congress but lost. Gupta was nominated BJP Delhi president on 15 May 2010.
He contested the 2013 Delhi Legislative Assembly election from New Delhi but lost to Arvind Kejriwal.

In Delhi state elections 2015, he contested again from Rohini and won. He was one of the three BJP candidates to pull a win. Vijender Gupta was appointed the leader of opposition (LoP) in the Delhi assembly on 16 April 2015.

He defeated Aam Aadmi Party Candidate of Rohini Rajesh Nama 'Bansiwala' in 2020 Delhi Legislative Assembly election by a margin of more than 12,000 votes.

References 

Living people
Shri Ram College of Commerce alumni
1963 births
Delhi MLAs 2015–2020
Delhi MLAs 2020–2025
Bharatiya Janata Party politicians from Delhi
Leaders of the Opposition in the Delhi Legislative Assembly